Latter Day Saint martyrs are persons who belonged to the Church of Jesus Christ of Latter-day Saints (LDS Church) or another church within the Latter Day Saint movement who were killed or otherwise persecuted to the point of premature death on account of their religious beliefs, or while performing their religious duties.

Although the term "martyr" is not frequently used in Latter Day Saint terminology, Latter Day Saints recognize a number of prophets, apostles, and other religious persons as recorded in the Bible, including both the Old Testament and New Testament, and Book of Mormon as martyrs within the same religious tradition (albeit at an earlier time) to which they subscribe.  For Latter Day Saints, the most notable martyr is Jesus Christ.  Other scriptural examples include Abel ("the first martyr"), John the Baptist, James, the brother of John, Stephen whose stoning is recorded in the Book of Acts, Abinadi, women and children of Ammonihah, etc.  Latter Day Saints also acknowledge as "Early-day Saint" martyrs those early Christians who were killed for their faith prior to or as a result of the Great Apostasy.

The most notable post-Biblical Latter Day Saint martyrs are Joseph Smith and his brother, Hyrum Smith.

Individuals who die "in the Lord's service" are believed to be rewarded with eternal life:  "And whoso layeth down his life in my cause, for my name's sake, shall find it again, even life eternal." Joseph F. Smith, LDS Church president, declared: "I beheld that the faithful elders of this dispensation, when they depart from mortal life, continue their labors in the preaching of the gospel ... in the great world of the spirits."

In 1989, following the death of two LDS Church missionaries in Bolivia, apostle L. Tom Perry noted that from 1831 until 1989, "only seventeen LDS missionaries [were] killed by assassins." Also at that time, apostle M. Russell Ballard "indicated that of the 447,969 missionaries who have served since the days of Joseph Smith, only 525—about one-tenth of 1 percent—have lost their lives through accident, illness, or other causes while serving. 'When you contemplate that number,' he said, 'it appears that the safest place to be in the whole world is on a full-time mission.'"

Missionaries who died from illness or accident are not listed. However, depending on the circumstances of their death, they could be deemed "martyrs" for having died while in religious service.

Many Mormon pioneers and other early church members who suffered privation and early death on account of their religious beliefs would likely qualify as "martyrs." However, they are too numerous to list here. This list also does not include early Mormon settlers who were killed in encounters with Native Americans during the Mormon settlement of the American West.

List of Latter Day Saint martyrs

See also 

Anti-Mormonism
Death of Joseph Smith
Haun's Mill massacre
Missouri Executive Order 44
Mormon War (1838)
Mormonism and violence
Persecution
Religious discrimination
Religious persecution

Notes 

 History of the Church, Volume 1
 Mormon Redress Petitions
 Sacred places : a comprehensive guide to early LDS historical sites, Volume four, Missouri, LaMar C. Berrett, general editor ; Max H. Parkin, pp. 105–6.

References 
 
 

 
Lists of Christian martyrs
Lists of people by cause of death
Lists of religious figures